Los Enemigos (English: The Enemies) may refer to:

"Enemigos" (song), a 2020 song by Aitana and Reik
Los Enemigos (film), a 1983 Argentine film
Los Enemigos (opera), an opera by Mesías Maiguashca

See also
El Enemigo (disambiguation)